Colin Mackleworth (born 24 March 1947) is a former footballer who played for West Ham United and Leicester City as  a goalkeeper.

Football career
Mackleworth joined West Ham United in 1962 as an apprentice. He played in West Ham's Youth Cup winning side of 1963 making his first-team debut in December 1966 in a 4–0 home win against Blackpool. Serving as understudy to regular goalkeeper, Jim Standen, he made only three appearances; his last being in a famous Manchester United 6–1 victory at Upton Park in which Manchester United won the 1966-67 Football League trophy. He left West Ham in November 1967 and joined Leicester City. Mackleworth failed to make an impact at Leicester and was understudy to Peter Shilton. Making only six appearances he joined Kettering Town. Following his stint at Kettering, Mackleworth moved back to London, playing for both Clapton and Metropolitan Police.

After football
After he left professional football he joined the police force serving at Bow police station where he was often on duty at West Ham's ground, Upton Park.

References

External links
At Neil Brown

1947 births
Footballers from Bow, London
English footballers
Association football goalkeepers
West Ham United F.C. players
Leicester City F.C. players
Kettering Town F.C. players
Clapton F.C. players
Metropolitan Police F.C. players
English Football League players
British police officers
Living people